The Stoolie is a 1972 comedy thriller film co-directed by John G. Avildsen and George Silano and starring comedian Jackie Mason.

Production
The film was produced under the working title Roger of Miami Beach.

See also
 List of American films of 1972

External links

1972 films
1970s crime comedy films
American comedy thriller films
American crime comedy films
Films directed by John G. Avildsen
Films set in Miami
Films set in New Jersey
Films shot in Miami
Films shot in New Jersey
Embassy Pictures films
1972 comedy films
1970s English-language films
1970s American films